Ulloa and 14th Avenue is a future light rail stop on the Muni Metro L Taraval line, located at the intersection of Ulloa Street and 14th Avenue in the West Portal neighborhood of San Francisco, California. The stop will open in 2024, consolidating stops along Ulloa at 15th Avenue and Forest Side Avenue. The stop does not have platforms; passengers wait on the sidewalk on the near side of the intersection.

Service 
Since August 2020, service along the route is temporarily being provided by buses to allow for the construction of improvements to the L Taraval line. The project is expected to wrap up in 2024.

References 

Muni Metro stations